UAAP Season 68 was the 2005–06 season of the University Athletic Association of the Philippines. Several events were held, the most prominent was the basketball tournament. The tournament is divided into three divisions: the Juniors tournament for high school students, the Women's tournament for female college students, and the Men's tournament for male college students

The FEU Tamaraws swept the defending champions La Salle Green Archers, 2 games to none in the Men's tournament to take their record-breaking 19th title, with Arwind Santos as the Finals MVP. It was a rematch of the 2004 Final, where the Archers prevailed, 2–1.

In the juniors division, the De La Salle Zobel Junior Archers swept the UPIS Junior Maroons, 2–0, to take their first UAAP title. It was also La Salle's first Juniors title since the 1955 La Salle Green Hills championship in the NCAA.

In the women's tournament, the Ateneo Lady Eagles swept the Adamson Lady Falcons, 2 games to none, to win their first UAAP women's title. The Lady Eagles snapped the Lady Falcons' two year title run.

Basketball

Men's tournament

Elimination round

Note: The "final" team standings were adjusted  when La Salle forfeited its games after the season was over. See Suspension of De La Salle University-Manila for details.

Playoffs

Awardees

Finals Most Valuable Player: 
Season Most Valuable Player: 
Rookie of the Year:

Women's tournament

Awardees
Finals Most Valuable Player: 
Season Most Valuable Player: 
Rookie of the Year:

Juniors' tournament
The Juniors' tournament saw the return of Far Eastern University juniors team, the FEU-FERN Baby Tamaraws.

Elimination round

Playoffs

Semifinals
In the semifinals, the higher seed has the twice-to-beat advantage, where they only have to win once, while their opponents twice, to progress.

Ateneo vs. UPIS
The Ateneo Blue Eaglets had the twice-to-beat advantage.

DLSZ vs. FEU-FERN
The De La Salle Junior Archers had twice-to-beat advantage.

Finals

Awardees
Finals Most Valuable Player: 
Season Most Valuable Player: 
Rookie of the Year:

Cheerdance
The Cheerdance Competition was held on September 17, 2005 at the Araneta Coliseum.

General championship summary 
The general champion is determined by a point system. The system gives 15 points to the champion team of a UAAP event, 12 to the runner-up, and 10 to the third placer. The following points: 8, 6, 4, 2 and 1 are given to the rest of the participating teams according to their order of finish.

Medals table

Seniors' division

Juniors' division

General championship tally

Seniors' division

Juniors' division

Individual awards
Athlete of the Year: 
 Seniors: 
 Juniors:

Suspension of De La Salle University-Manila
Controversy surrounded the UAAP after De La Salle University-Manila (DLSU) discovered that two members of its men's basketball team were ineligible to play in the UAAP from the 2003–2004 up to the 2005–2006 season. The players failed Department of Education's Philippine Educational Placement Test Certificate of Rating (PEPTCR, a replacement for a high school diploma). The University has offered to return the 2004 championship and 2005 runner-up trophy and file a leave of absence from the league.

In its meeting on April 21, 2006 in Adamson University, members of the UAAP Board unanimously decided to suspend DLSU in all sports events of the UAAP for the entire 2006–2007 season as a consequence of the university's negligence and inaction against the two ineligible players.

The board has also forfeited all of La Salle's men's basketball games from 2003 to 2004. The board awarded the 2004 title to FEU as a result.

If the forfeited games are factored in, the final elimination round standings is:

All of La Salle's victories in the playoffs were also forfeited; if La Salle won the 2005 title, they would've surrendered back the trophy to the finals opponents, FEU.

See also
 NCAA Season 81

References

 
UAAP
2005 in Philippine sport
68